"Kansas City" is a song from the 1943 musical Oklahoma!. The plot set-up for it is the return of cowboy Will Parker from an excursion to the city of the same name. He describes his experiences in song. The song describes the wonders of the city and its entertainments (from the viewpoint of a country bumpkin), all reprising with the concept that the conditions (in 1906) represent the ultimate in progress, with little more expected.

For the 1955 motion picture, a few lyrics about a burlesque stripteaser had to undergo minor changes to pass film censorship. In the original Broadway musical, Will sings:

For the film, these were changed to:

Building
The song includes the lyrics:

The tallest buildings there in 1906 (the era when the musical is set) were the 12-story New York Life Insurance Building and the newly built 17-story Commerce Trust Tower.

Covers 

 Political satirist Randy Rainbow did a parody of the song, changing it to "Ted and Lindsey!" about public dislike of Republican Senators Ted Cruz and Lindsey Graham.

References

Songs about Missouri
Songs from Oklahoma!
Songs about cities in the United States
1943 songs
Songs with music by Richard Rodgers
Songs with lyrics by Oscar Hammerstein II
Songs about Oklahoma